This is a timeline of the Sui dynasty.

580s

590s

600s

610s

References

Bibliography

Sui